Leucogoniella californica is a moth of the family Gelechiidae. It was described by Keifer in 1930. It is found in North America, where it has been recorded from California and Arizona.

References

Moths described in 1930
Anacampsini